The Boulders, also known as the James Orville and Adelene Buston Cammack House, is a historic home located at Greencastle, Putnam County, Indiana. It was built in 1910, and is a -story, American Craftsman style wood frame bungalow.  It is sheathed in stained cypress clapboards and sits on a concrete foundation with a veneer of glacial stones. Stones were also used to face the porch piers. Additions were made to the house in 1988–1989. Also on the property is the contributing landscape.

It was listed on the National Register of Historic Places in 1993.

References

Houses on the National Register of Historic Places in Indiana
Bungalow architecture in Indiana
Houses completed in 1910
Buildings and structures in Putnam County, Indiana
National Register of Historic Places in Putnam County, Indiana